Knickerbockerglory is a television production company based in the UK.

History
The production company was founded in 2011 by Jonathan Stadlen.  Stadlen and other founding producers had worked on the Pineapple Dance Studios TV series which was cancelled about 2010 though recognised with a BAFTA nomination in 2011.  Knickerbockerglory claims to be the first production company to share its profits with its production teams.

Productions
The list of programmes and series produced by Knickerbockerglory include:

References

External links

 Official Website

Mass media companies established in 2011
Television production companies of the United Kingdom
British companies established in 2011
2011 establishments in England